Mohammed Qassem Al-Nakhli (born 19 January 1995) known as Mohammed Qassem is a Saudi Arabian football player who currently plays for Al-Nassr as a left back .

Honours
Al Ittihad
King Cup: 2013, 2018
Crown Prince Cup: 2016–17

Al-Faisaly
King Cup: 2020–21

External links
 

Living people
1994 births
Association football fullbacks
Saudi Arabian footballers
Ittihad FC players
Al-Fayha FC players
Al-Faisaly FC players
Al Nassr FC players
Saudi Professional League players
Saudi Arabia youth international footballers
Saudi Arabia international footballers
Saudi Arabian Shia Muslims